The longus capitis muscle (Latin for long muscle of the head, alternatively rectus capitis anticus major), is broad and thick above, narrow below, and arises by four tendinous slips, from the anterior tubercles of the transverse processes of the third, fourth, fifth, and sixth cervical vertebræ, and ascends, converging toward its fellow of the opposite side, to be inserted into the inferior surface of the basilar part of the occipital bone.

It is innervated by a branch of cervical plexus.

Longus capitis has several actions:

acting unilaterally, to:
flex the head and neck laterally
rotate the head ipsilaterally
acting bilaterally:
flex the head and neck

Additional images

References

External links
 
 PTCentral

Muscles of the head and neck